Çardaqlı (also, Çardaxlı, Chardakhly and Karadzhally) is a village in the Qubadli Rayon of Azerbaijan.

Under the ceasefire agreement signed at the end of the Second Nagorno-Karabakh War, the area was ceded to Azerbaijan on December 1, 2020 after occupation by Armenian forces following the First Nagorno-Karabakh War.

References 

Çardaqlı at GeoNames

Populated places in Qubadli District